Folsom is a surname. Notable people with the surname include:

Abby Folsom (died 1867), American feminist and abolitionist
Allan Folsom (1941-2014), American motion picture cameraman, editor, writer, and producer 
Amanda Folsom (born 1979), American mathematician
Augustine H. Folsom (died 1926), photographer
Beth Folsom, American politician
Burton W. Folsom, Jr. (born 1947), American historian and author. Wrote The Myth of the Robber Barons
David Folsom (born 1947), US District Court Judge
Frances Folsom Cleveland Preston (1864–1947), who married the President of the United States, Grover Cleveland
Frank M. Folsom (1894–1970), electronics company executive
Franklin Folsom (1907-1995), children's author and labor activist
Fred Folsom (1871–1944), American football coach at the University of Colorado (1895–1915) and Dartmouth College (1903–1906)
George Folsom (1802–1869), American antiquarian, librarian, diplomat, lawyer and politician
J. D. Folsom (born 1984), American football linebacker
Jim Folsom, Sr. (1908–1987), American Democratic Governor of Alabama
Jim Folsom, Jr. (born 1949), former American Democratic Governor of Alabama, and who also served as the Lieutenant Governor both before and after that
Jonathan P. Folsom (1820–1893), twentieth Mayor of Lowell, Massachusetts
Joseph Libbey Folsom (1817–1855), U.S. Army officer and real estate investor
Marion B. Folsom (1893–1976),  U.S. Secretary of Health, Education, and Welfare
Nathaniel Folsom (1726–1790), American merchant and statesman
Richard G. Folsom (1907–1996), twelfth president of Rensselaer Polytechnic Institute
Robert Folsom (1927-2017), American businessman and politician
Steve Folsom (born 1958), player with the National Football League
Tom Folsom (born 1974), writer living in New York
William Harrison Folsom (1815–1901), American architect and contractor